Paimpol is a commune in the Côtes-d'Armor department in Brittany in northwest France.

It is a tourist destination, especially during the summer months when people are attracted by its port and beaches.

Geography
The town is located in the north of Brittany, at the western end of the bay of Saint-Brieuc, at the bottom of the bay of Paimpol.

The town is on the old national road D 786, 72 mi east of Saint-Malo, 23 mi south-east of Saint-Brieuc, 21 mi west of Lannion (sub-prefecture) and 44 mi to the south-west of Morlaix . Guingamp (sub-prefecture) is 18 mi to the south, and Rennes is 88 mi to the south-east.

Population

Inhabitants of Paimpol are called paimpolais in French. In 1960 Paimpol absorbed the former communes Kerity and Plounez. The population data given in the table below for 1954 and earlier refer to Paimpol proper, without Kerity and Plounez.

Breton language
The municipality launched a linguistic plan through Ya d'ar brezhoneg on 29 September 2008.

In 2008, 11.8% of primary school children attended bilingual schools.

Transport
Paimpol station is connected by trains to Guingamp station on the Paris-Montparnasse–Brest line.

Sights

Blue and white striped-jumpers are immediately visible in the streets and are seen to reflect not only their pride in all things to do with the sea, but  also in their région, Brittany.

The town centre leads from the port down to the coast, through  cobbled streets filled with  restaurants, cafés and bars. The town centre includes the Quartier Latin. It was at La place du Martray that Pierre Loti chose to put the house of Gaud, the heroine of his  novel Pêcheur d'Islande. The attractions of the town are also a major theme of Guy Ropartz's opera Le Pays and Théodore Botrel's song La Paimpolaise.

Other popular tourist sights include: the Abbaye de Beauport dating back to 1202, and the chapels of Lanvignec, Ste Barbe and Kergrist.
L'île de Bréhat is a rocky archipelago 10 minutes by ferry from the coast next to Paimpol. It is made up of two large islands connected by a bridge, and numerous smaller ones.

Other places of interest in the area include the Moulin de Craca and Circuit de falaises in Plouézec, as well as Pors-Even and the Tour de Kerroc'h in Ploubazlanec.

The Monument to Théodore Botrel in Paimpol is by Pierre Charles Lenoir

The monument aux morts has sculpture by André César Vermare

Events
Tourists are well catered for with regular events such as the Tuesday morning street market, night-markets, and "Mardi du port" – where tourists can enjoy diverse world music beside the port.

Paimpol is also home to the bi-annual "Festival du chant de marin" (sea shanty festival) which attracts thousands of visitors over three days in August.

Gallery

International relations
The following towns are twinned with Paimpol:
  Grundarfjörður, Iceland
 Romsey, United Kingdom
 Vermilion, United States

See also
Communes of the Côtes-d'Armor department

References

External links

Official website 
Sea shanty festival 2011 
Paimpol.net 

Populated coastal places in Brittany
Communes of Côtes-d'Armor